VCI may refer to:

Organisations
 Vaccination Credential Initiative, Digital Vaccine Record coalition
 Veterinary Council of India
 Video Collection International, a UK company
 Volatile corrosion inhibitor
 Volunteer Centres Ireland

Schools
 Valencia Colleges (Bukidnon) Inc.

Science and technology
 Virtual channel identifier, in telecommunications
 VideoCipher I, a variant of the Videocipher scrambling system
 Volatile corrosion inhibitor or vapor corrosion inhibitor, a type of corrosion inhibitor

Other uses
 AMX-VCI (Véhicule de Combat d'Infanterie), a tank
 Verbal Comprehension Index, in the WAIS-IV test

See also
 VC1 (disambiguation)